The 1993–94 season was Heart of Midlothian F.C.'s 11th consecutive season of play in the Scottish Premier Division. Hearts also competed in the UEFA Cup, Scottish Cup and the Scottish League Cup.

Fixtures

Friendlies

Uefa Cup

League Cup

Scottish Cup

Scottish Premier Division

Scottish Premier Division table

Stats

Squad information

Appearances (starts and substitute appearances) and goals include those in Scottish Premier Division, Scottish Cup, League Cup and the UEFA Cup.
Squad only includes players currently registered with the club and those with professional contracts only.

Scorers

See also
List of Heart of Midlothian F.C. seasons

References 

1993-94

External links 
 Official Club website

Heart of Midlothian F.C. seasons
Heart of Midlothian